State Trunk Highway 48 (often called Highway 48, STH-48 or WIS 48) is a state highway in the U.S. state of Wisconsin. It runs east–west in northwest Wisconsin from Grantsburg to Exeland.

Route description
The highway begins at its intersection with Highway 70 in Grantsburg.The intersection is also the northern terminus of Highway 87. The highway runs south from the intersection in a concurrency with Highway 87, passing through the community of Branstad before leaving the concurrency and running east from it. Near Trade Lake (community), Wisconsin, the highway intersects with four county highways; Y, O, M, and Z. It continues east from there until it reaches Frederic, where a concurrency starts with Highway 35. The highway continues south along the concurrency until it reaches Luck, where it runs east from. In Cumberland, it follows a short concurrency with U.S. Route 63. After passing Highway 25 and an interchange with U.S. Route 53, it passes through Rice Lake. It continues east from Rice Lake, passing through a few villages and unincorporated communities before terminating at Highway 40 in Weirgor.

Major intersections

See also

References

External links

048
Transportation in Burnett County, Wisconsin
Transportation in Polk County, Wisconsin
Transportation in Barron County, Wisconsin
Transportation in Washburn County, Wisconsin
Transportation in Sawyer County, Wisconsin